Khajuri Chanha is a village development committee in Dhanusa District in the Janakpur Zone of south-eastern Nepal. At the time of the 1991 Nepal census it had a population of 5,215 persons living in 965 individual households.

Transport

Khajuri Chanha is served by Khajuri railway station of Nepal Railways.

References

External links
UN map of the municipalities of Dhanusa District

Populated places in Dhanusha District